Broken World Media was an American record label based in Pittsburgh, Pennsylvania, founded in 2012 by Nicole Shanholtzer (formerly of The World Is a Beautiful Place & I Am No Longer Afraid to Die) and subsequently closed in 2017. Broken World Media eschews the traditional independent record label approach to work with a wide variety of artists on a project-by-project basis.

Selected artists
Empire! Empire! (I Was a Lonely Estate)
Old Gray
Rozwell Kid
Brightside
Oliver Houston
Saintseneca
Sorority Noise
Tiny Moving Parts
Perspective, A Lovely Hand To Hold
Sioux Falls

References

American record labels
Companies based in Pittsburgh
Record labels established in 2012